The 112th Field Artillery Regiment is a Field Artillery Branch regiment of the New Jersey Army National Guard first formed in April 1917. In December 1941, it was the last field artillery regiment in the U.S. Army to convert from horse-drawn to truck-drawn howitzers.

Only the 3rd Battalion of the 112th Field Artillery Regiment is currently active. Headquartered in Morristown, NJ, it is the Direct Support FA Battalion for the 44th Infantry Brigade Combat Team.  Headquarters Battery, Battery A, and Company F, 250th Brigade Support Battalion (the battalion's Forward Support Company) are also located in Morristown.  Battery B is located in Flemington, Battery C is in Toms River, and the Fire Support Detachment is located in Freehold.  3-112 FAR is a M119A3 and M777A2-equipped composite FA battalion.

History
Organized 3 April 1917 in the New Jersey National Guard from new and existing units as the 1st Battalion, Field Artillery, with headquarters at Camden
Expanded, reorganized, and redesignated 17 July 1917 as the 1st Field Artillery Drafted into federal service 5 August 1917
Reorganized and redesignated 15 September 1917 as the 110th Field Artillery and assigned to the 29th Division
Redesignated 27 September 1917 as the 112th Field Artillery and remained assigned to the 29th Division
Demobilized 31 May 1919 at Camp Dix, New Jersey
Reorganized 1920-1921 in the New Jersey National Guard as the 1st Battalion, Field Artillery; Headquarters federally recognized 27 June 1921 at East Orange
Expanded, reorganized, and redesignated 20 April 1922 as the 112th Field Artillery and assigned to the 44th Division; Headquarters federally recognized 8 January 1924 at Camden. Location of headquarters changed 10 May 1929 to Trenton.
Relieved 1 December 1939 from assignment to the 44th Division (1st Battalion concurrently redesignated as the 1st Battalion, 165th Field Artillery, an element of the 44th Division-see ANNEX 2; new 1st Battalion concurrently organized from the former 1st Battalion, 165th Field Artillery [organized and federally recognized 15 November 1939 in the New Jersey National Guard with headquarters at Morristown])
Inducted into federal service 27 January 1941 at home stations
Regiment broken up l May 1943 and its elements reorganized and redesignated as follows:
Headquarters and the 1st Battalion as the 695th Field Artillery Battalion 2d Battalion as the 696th Field Artillery Battalion (Headquarters Battery as Headquarters and Headquarters Battery, 112th Field Artillery Group - hereafter separate lineage)
After 1 May 1943 the above units underwent changes as follows: 695th Field Artillery Battalion reorganized and redesignated 26 August 1943 as the 695th Armored Field Artillery Battalion Inactivated 2 November 1945 at Camp Myles Standish, Massachusetts Reorganized and federally recognized 17 December 1946 with headquarters at Morristown
696th Field Artillery Battalion reorganized and redesignated 26 August 1943 as the 696th Armored Field Artillery Battalion
Inactivated 27 October 1945 at Camp Patrick Henry, Virginia
Reorganized and federally recognized 24 September 1946 with headquarters at Trenton
Ordered into active federal service 3 September 1950 at home stations
(695th Armored Field Artillery Battalion [NGUS] organized and federally recognized 10 November 1952 with headquarters at Morristown
Released 17 December 1954 from active federal service and reverted to state control; federal recognition concurrently withdrawn from the 695th Armored Field Artillery Battalion [NGUS]
695th and 696th Armored Field Artillery Battalions consolidated 1 March 1959 with the 228th (see ANNEX 1), 199th (see ANNEX 2), 157th (see ANNEX 3), and 286th (see ANNEX 4) Armored Field Artillery Battalions to form the 112th Artillery, a parent regiment under the Combat Arms Regimental System, to consist of the 1st, 2d, and 3d Howitzer Battalions and the 4th Rocket Howitzer Battalion, elements of the 50th Armored Division, and the 5th and 6th Howitzer Battalions
Reorganized 31 January 1963 to consist of the 1st, 2d, 3d, 4th, and 6th Battalions, elements of the 50th Armored Division, and the 5th Howitzer Battalion
Reorganized 15 March 1966 to consist of the 1st, 2d, 3d, 4th, and 6th Battalions, elements of the 50th Armored Division, the 5th Howitzer Battalion, and the 7th Battalion
Reorganized 1 February 1968 to consist of the 3d, 4th, and 6th Battalions, elements of the 50th Armored Division, and the 1st, 5th, and 7th Battalions
Reorganized 1 December 1971 to consist of the 3d, 4th, and 6th Field Artillery Battalions, elements of the 50th Armored Division, and the 1st, 5th, and 7th Battalions
Reorganized in April 1972 to consist of the 3d, 4th, and 6th Field Artillery Battalions, elements of the 50th Armored Division, and the 1st and 5th Battalions
Redesignated 1 May 1972 as the 112th Field Artillery
Reorganized 1 May 1975 to consist of the 3d and 4th Battalions, elements of the 50th Armored Division, and the 1st and 5th Battalions
Reorganized 1 July.1975 to consist of the 1st, 3d, 4th, and 5th Battalions, elements of the 50th Armored Division
Reorganized 1 May 1980 to consist of the 1st, 3d, and 4th Battalions, elements of the 50th Armored Division
Withdrawn 1 June 1989 from the Combat Arms Regimental System and reorganized under the United States Army Regimental System
Reorganized 1 September 1991 to consist of the 1st and 3d Battalions, elements of the 50th Armored Division
Reorganized 1 September 1993 to consist of the 1st and 3d Battalions, elements of the 42d Infantry Division
Reorganized 1 September 1997 to consist of the 3d Battalion and Battery D, elements of the 42d Infantry Division
Battery D ordered into active federal service 26 May 2003 at Cherry Hill; released from active federal service 24 May 2004 and reverted to state control
Redesignated 1 October 2005 as the 112th Field Artillery Regiment
Reorganized 1 March 2008 to consist of the 3rd Battalion, an element of the 50th Infantry Combat Team
Ordered into active federal service 16 June 2008 at home stations; released from active federal service 20 July and reverted to state control

Annex 1 
1st Battalion, 157th Field Artillery, inducted into federal service 16 September 1940 at home stations Redesignated 20 February 1942 as the 1st Battalion, 228th Field Artillery, and relieved from assignment to the 44th Division
Reorganized and redesignated 1 March 1943 as the 228th Field Artillery Battalion Inactivated 27 October 1945 at Camp Myies Standish, Massachusetts
Redesignated 5 July 1946 as the 228th Armored Field Artillery Battalion and assigned to the 50th Armored Division
Reorganized and federally recognized 31 October 1946 at Camden

Annex 2
1st Battalion, 165th Field Artillery, inducted Into federal service 16 September 1940 at home stations Reorganized and redesignated 20 February 1942 as the 199th Field Artillery Battalion and relieved from assignment to the 44th Division
Inactivated 23 October 1945 at Camp Shanks, New York
Redesignated 5 July 1946 as the 199th Armored Field Artillery Battalion and assigned to the 50th Armored Division
Reorganized and federally recognized 26 November 1945 with headquarters at East Orange

Annex 3
Organized and federally recognized 8 June 1936 in the New Jersey National Guard as the 2d Battalion, 157th Field Artillery, an element of the 44th Division, with headquarters at Atlantic City Inducted into federal service 16 September 1940 at home stations
Disbanded 7 January 1941 at Fort Dix, New Jersey
Reconstituted 25 August 1945 In the New Jersey National Guard as the 2d Battalion, 157th Field Artillery
Redesignated 9 July 1946 as the 157th Field Artillery Battalion
Reorganized and federally recognized 12 February 1947 with headquarters at Atlantic City
Reorganized and redesignated l October 1954 as the 157th Armored Field Artillery Battalion

Annex 4
Constituted 9 July 1946 in the New Jersey National Guard as the 308th Antiaircraft Artillery Searchlight Battalion Redesignated 1 December 1947 as the 308th Antiaircraft Artillery Gun Battalion
Organized and federally recognized 9 January 1950 with headquarters at Rio Grande
Redesignated l October 1953 as the 308th Antiaircraft Artillery Battalion
Converted and redesignated l February 1955 as the 286th Armored Field Artillery

Campaign participation credit

World War I

Streamer without inscription

World War II
 Normandy;
Northern France;
Rhineland;
Ardennes-Alsace;
Central Europe

Headquarters Battery (Morristown) and Battery A (Morristown), 3d Battalion, each additionally entitled to:

World War I
 Meuse-Argonne
 Alsace 1918

War on Terrorism: Campaigns to be determined

Decorations
 Presidential Unit Citation (Army)
 Streamer embroidered MOSELLE RIVER Headquarters Battery (Morristown) and Battery A (Morristown)

3d Battalion, each additionally entitled to:
 Presidential Unit Citation (Army)
 Streamer embroidered SCHALBACH Battery B (Lawrenceville)

3d Battalion, additionally entitled to:
 French Croix de Guerre with Palm
 World War II
 Streamer embroidered MOSELLE RIVER

References

External links
 
 
 http://www.history.army.mil/html/forcestruc/lineages/branches/fa/default.htm 
 http://www.nj.gov/military/museum/narratives/112TH_FIELD_ARTILLERY_REGIMEN.html
 https://web.archive.org/web/20130419142630/http://www.njarmyguard.com/stories/28/

112
F 112
112
New Jersey National Guard
Military units and formations established in 1917